The Freedom Defence Committee was a UK-based organisation set up on 3 March 1945  to "uphold the essential liberty of individuals and organisations, and to defend those who are persecuted for exercising their rights to freedom of speech, writing and action." Chaired by Herbert Read, with Fenner Brockway and Patrick Figgis as vice-chairmen, the Committee's secretary was Ethel Mannin. Later, George Orwell became a vice-chair and George Woodcock, secretary.

The Committee came into being as a result of Freedom Press and five private houses being raided by police on 12 December 1944, and three editors of War Commentary, Vernon Richards, Philip Sansom and John Hewetson being prosecuted at the beginning of 1945 for conspiring "to undermine the affections of members of His Majesty's Forces" and because the National Council for Civil Liberties was considered a Communist front.

The three were convicted at the Central Criminal Court, "Old Bailey", on 27 April 1945, and sentenced to 9 months imprisonment.

An open letter requesting urgent funds was published in the 18 September 1948 issue of Socialist Leader and was signed by Benjamin Britten, E. M. Forster, Augustus John, Orwell, Read and Osbert Sitwell. 

It was dissolved in 1949.

References 

Human rights organisations based in the United Kingdom
Organizations established in 1945
Organizations disestablished in 1949
Civil liberties advocacy groups
George Orwell